The Caribbean Circuit also known as the Caribbean Sunshine Circuit or Caribbean Tennis Tour was a series tour of tennis tournaments held in the Caribbean region usually over a period of two to three months between January and March each year. The circuit began in the mid-1920s reaching prominence during the 1950s and 1960s. It declined in importance in the early 1970s and was discontinued due to an increase in indoor tournaments being staged.

History
The Caribbean Circuit which was a major sub-circuit of the international tennis scene that began in the early 1920s reaching prominence during the 1950s and 1960s. Officials from the from the participating regional and national tennis associations and tournament organisers usually met in the preceding summer to agree a schedule of events, and draw up a list of players they wished to invite to participate in the circuit, this was normally announced in December each year. The circuit declined in importance in the early 1970s, and its demise was as a direct result in a rise in prestige of new indoor tennis tournaments at the time.

Circuit tournaments

Addtional notes
Not all tournaments listed were staged simultaneously a schedule of usually eight to twelve tournaments participated each year over a period of two months, during the peak decades of the 1950s and 1960s though this varied.

References

Defunct tennis tours